By the People, for the People is a compilation album by American heavy metal band Mudvayne. It was released on November 27, 2007 by Epic Records. The album features a track listing chosen entirely by the band's fans, with the band determining which version appears on the record (e.g. live, demo, acoustic), as well as two new songs, "Dull Boy" and a cover of The Police's song "King of Pain" (both produced by Dave Fortman). If the album was pre-ordered through the Sony Music Store, it was packaged with a free lithograph of the lyrics to "Dull Boy", signed and numbered by Mudvayne vocalist Chad Gray. If it was ordered after the disc was released, the lithograph was shipped approximately three weeks later and was neither signed nor numbered.

By the People, for the People is presented in a format where each song is introduced through a short interlude generally no longer than 30 seconds long, where Chad Gray debriefs the listener on surrounding facts such as where the song was recorded or performed live, or distinguishing a demo from an album version (obviously limited to in the case of demos).

The album debuted at number 51 on the U.S. Billboard 200 chart, selling about 22,000 copies in its first week.

Track listing

Personnel 
 Chad Gray – lead vocals
 Greg Tribbett – guitars, backing vocals
 Ryan Martinie – bass
 Matthew McDonough – drums
Other personnel
 Dave Fortman – production

Chart positions

Album

Singles

References 

2007 compilation albums
Albums produced by Dave Fortman
Epic Records compilation albums
Mudvayne albums